Dr. Margarita Tamargo-Sanchez (September 30, 1915 in Havana, Cuba – October 2, 2005 in Miami, Florida) was a prominent pharmacist and bacteriologist in Cuba.

Dr. Tamargo-Sanchez was the daughter of Domingo Tamargo-Bautista (1883–1947) and Gloria Sanchez-del Monte (1888–1963). She never married but had three siblings, Ana Gloria (1910–1996) (wife of Francisco Diaz-Silveira Lopez), Domingo Alberto (1913–2002), and Alberto (1919–1984).

She graduated from University of Havana in 1939, obtaining a doctorate in pharmacy, and became the director of the pharmacy department of the anti-tuberculosis Children's Hospital in Havana. In 1949, she won a scholarship to further studies specialized in bacteriology with Sir Alexander Fleming, who discovered penicillin, becoming the first Cuban woman to obtain this scholarship.  She studied under the direction of Dr. Fleming at St. Mary's Hospital in the University of London and, later, Dr. Fleming and his wife visited Tamargo-Sanchez and her family in Cuba, where, at her request, he lectured at the University of Havana.

She came to the United States in 1968 and worked at Mount Sinai Hospital, New York, until her retirement in 1980. She then spent her last 22 years in Miami with her family.

References

 The Miami Herald - October 4, 2005
 Anuario Social de La Habana 1939, Julio de Cespedes & Miguel Baguer, editors (Havana, Cuba: Luz-Hilo, S.A., 1939) 
 Directorio Social de la Habana 1948, Maria R. de Fontanills & Eduardo Fontanills Jr., editors (Havana, Cuba: P. Fernandez y Cia., S. en C., 1948) 
 Libro de Oro de la Sociedad Habanera 1949, Joaquin de Posada, Eduardo Cidre & Pablo Alvarez de Canas, editors (Havana, Cuba: Editorial Lex, 1949) 
 Libro de Oro de la Sociedad Habanera 1950, Joaquin de Posada, Eduardo Cidre & Pablo Alvarez de Canas, editors (Havana, Cuba: Editorial Lex, 1950) 
 Libro de Oro de la Sociedad Habanera 1953, Joaquin de Posada & Pablo Alvarez de Canas, editors (Havana, Cuba: Editorial Lex, 1953) 
 Registro Social de la Habana 1955, Julio de Cespedes, editor (Havana, Cuba: Molina y Cia., S.A., 1955) 
 Registro Social de la Habana 1958, Julio de Cespedes, editor (Havana, Cuba: Molina y Cia., S.A., 1958) 
 Anuario de Familias Cubanas 1988, Joaquin de Posada, editor (Costa Rica: Trejos Hermanos Sucrs., Inc., 1988) 

Cuban emigrants to the United States
Cuban pharmacologists
1915 births
2005 deaths